Wilfrid Kidson (13 March 1907 – 2 May 1986) was a South African cricketer. He played in five first-class matches for Border in 1931/32.

See also
 List of Border representative cricketers

References

External links
 

1907 births
1986 deaths
South African cricketers
Border cricketers
Sportspeople from Qonce